German Aircraft GmbH is a former aircraft manufacturer. Its main product was the German Aircraft Sky-Maxx, formerly produced as the S.A.I. Aeronautica G97 Spotter, developed by Stephan Kohl. Kohl renamed his aircraft the Kohl Mythos (Greek for "legend" or "story") and put it into production himself under contract in Italy.

References

Defunct aircraft manufacturers of Germany